Thomas Telford University Technical College (formerly West Midlands Construction UTC) is a mixed University Technical College (UTC) located in Wolverhampton, England. It opened in 2015, and is located on a former National Health Service site, which was vacated in 2012.

History
The University of Wolverhampton acquired the derelict 11.3-acre listed Springfield Brewery site in 2014 where it constructed a permanent home for the West Midlands Construction UTC. The new facility opened in 2016.

In 2009 it was announced that the college would expand its age range to 11 and expand the number of school places. The college also became part of the Thomas Telford Trust and changed its name to Thomas Telford University Technical College. The first intake is planned for September 2021.

References

External links 
 Thomas Telford University Technical College official site

Secondary schools in Wolverhampton
Educational institutions established in 2015
2015 establishments in England
University Technical Colleges